Aurora: Operation Intercept is a 1995 thriller film directed by Paul Levine and starring Bruce Payne, Lance Henriksen and John Stockwell.

The "Aurora" is a secret hypersonic military aircraft based at Groom Lake. It is very similar to what aviation experts assume to be the Aurora aircraft. In the film, it is being stolen by a Russian terrorist who tries to destroy the White House. The propulsion system is a "combined cycle" conventional/scramjet engine.

Summary 
Francesca Zaborszin (Natalya Andrejchenko) believes that the U.S. government murdered her father (Curt Lowens), a Soviet scientist and defector, and made it look like suicide.

Francesca sets up her own base in the deserts of Kazakhstan, wielding powerful electromagnetic pulses channeled through orbiting GPS satellites to attack and bring down civilian aircraft. She also captures the revolutionary high-altitude fighter-bomber Aurora One.

Summoned to strike back are Major Paul Gordon Pruitt (Bruce Payne) and Major Andy Aldrich (John Stockwell), who soar into action in Aurora Two. Forced down by Zaborszin, the pair are caught and tortured by her private army of sinister Slavs, but Pruitt escapes.

Eventually, things lead both Francesca and Pruitt to take to the skies in separate Auroras. She penetrates D.C. airspace to make a bombing run at the White House, but Pruitt's afterburners cause Francesca's jet to barrel roll and explode, killing Francesca.

Cast

Bruce Payne as Gordon Pruett
Natalya Andrejchenko as Francesca Zaborszin
Lance Henriksen as William Stenghel
Corbin Bernsen as Flight Engineer Murphy
Curt Lowens as Dr. Zaborszin
John Stockwell as Andy Aldrich
Michael Champion as Johann Wells
Dennis Christopher as Victor Varenkov
Corinne Bohrer as Sharon Pruett

Significance

Commentators have noted that since the making of the film, reality has imitated fiction, in that the September 11 attacks involved the crashing of planes into strategic buildings.

References

External links
 

1990s thriller drama films
1995 films
American aviation films
American thriller drama films
1990s English-language films
1990s American films